Ivan Orsen J. Caesar II (January 7, 1967 – April 28, 2008) was an American football linebacker who played one season with the Minnesota Vikings of the NFL as well as four seasons in the Arena Football League. He also played for the London Monarchs in 1996. Caesar attended Dorchester High School in Dorchester, Massachusetts and Boston College.

Caesar was shot and killed in his Orlando, Florida home on April 28, 2008.

References

External links
 
 

1967 births
2008 deaths
United States Virgin Islands players of American football
People from Saint Thomas, U.S. Virgin Islands
American football linebackers
Boston College Eagles football players
Male murder victims
Minnesota Vikings players
Philadelphia Eagles players
Tampa Bay Storm players
London Monarchs players
Portland Forest Dragons players
Milwaukee Mustangs (1994–2001) players
People murdered in Florida
Deaths by firearm in Florida
American murder victims